The 6th Aviation Regiment is one of the Australian Army's three Army Aviation regiments and was raised on 1 March 2008 to provide air mobility for the Australian Army Special Operations Command (SOCOMD).

The 6th Aviation Regiment is equipped with MRH-90 Taipan helicopters and forms part of the 16th Aviation Brigade. The regiment is headquartered at Luscombe Army Airfield, Holsworthy Barracks, Sydney which was vacated by 161st Reconnaissance Squadron of the 1st Aviation Regiment in 1995. The regiment is under the operational command of SOCOMD for "directed special operations tasking".

History

In November 2004, 'A' Squadron of the 5th Aviation Regiment based at RAAF Base Townsville swapped designations with the 171st Operational Support Squadron. The squadron separated from the 1st Aviation Regiment and was placed under the command of the 16th Aviation Brigade as an independent squadron and was renamed the "171st Aviation Squadron" to provide support to Special Operations Command. From December 2006, the squadron commenced relocating to Luscombe Airfield.

In March 2008, the 6th Aviation Regiment was raised following the implementation of a recommendation from the Board of Inquiry into the Crash of Black Hawk 221 and incorporated the 171st Aviation Squadron.

In November 2009, the Australian Army transferred all fixed wing surveillance aircraft to the Royal Australian Air Force. The 173rd Surveillance Squadron subsequently re-equipped with the Kiowa Light Utility Helicopter and re-roled as an Advanced Training Squadron for future Tiger ARH and MRH 90 Taipan pilots and was renamed the "173rd Aviation Squadron" based at Luscombe Airfield. In 2013, the squadron converted to Black Hawk helicopters.

Structure

The regiment comprises:

6th Aviation Regiment Headquarters (Holsworthy Barracks, Sydney, New South Wales)
171st Special Operations Aviation Squadron
173rd Aviation Squadron
Support Squadron

The 171st Special Operations Aviation Squadron is the regiment's operational squadron and 173rd Aviation Squadron is the regiment's training squadron.

Operations

Notable operations include:

Operation Queensland Flood Assist (2011 disaster assistance in South East Queensland)
2012 support to PNG elections

Current aircraft

The regiment operates a bespoke special operations MRH-90 Taipan. The MRH-90 is equipped with the Taipan Gun Mount that was specially designed for the special operations role. The gun mount can fit either a M134D minigun or a MAG 58 machine gun and when not in use can be moved into an outward stowed position to provide clearance to enable fast roping and rappelling.

The regiment was planned to transition to the MRH-90, an Australian variant of the NHI NH90, by December 2013 when the S70A-9 Black Hawk was to have been withdrawn from service. However, the MRH-90 program encountered significant problems, and in particular, the NH90 had not been operated in a dedicated special operations role, delaying the withdrawal with the Chief of Army extending the service of 20 Black Hawks to 2021 to develop a special operations role capable MRH90. This required developing a Fast Roping and Rappelling Extraction System (FRRES) and the gun mount for the cabin door.

In February 2019, the first two of twelve MRH90 helicopters were delivered to the regiment. In December 2021, on the same day the S70A-9 Black Hawk was withdrawn from service, the Australian government announced that it would replace the MRH-90s with new UH-60M Black Hawks.

Future acquisitions

The government in the Defence White Paper 2016 announced an plan to acquire light helicopters for the regiment to enable special forces to insert, extract and provide fire support for small teams of special forces undertaking tasks ranging from tactical observation through to counter-terrorism missions, or hostage recovery, that are optimised for operating in dense urban environments and can be deployed in the Boeing C-17 Globemaster.

Project Land 2097 Phase 4 will acquire a four tonne twin-engine helicopter with up to 18 helicopters to be purchased that will fulfil roles that the MRH 90 Taipan is unable to perform and that will be able to deploy quicker than both the retiring Black Hawk and the MRH 90 Taipan. The helicopter will be required to be able to insert and/or extract six soldiers, to be fast-roping capable, to have a sniping position, to be fitted with a Forward-looking infrared (FLIR) and to have the option of arming with a machine gun. A C-17 has to be capable of transporting four of the helicopters. Requests for tender closed in July 2020 with three bids received. Airbus Helicopters has partnered with Australian companies to form Team Nightjar to offer the H145M. Babcock Australasia has partnered with Bell to offer the Bell 429. Hawker Pacific has partnered with Bell to also offer the Bell 429. Boeing decided not to offer the AH-6. The delivery of the light helicopter is expected to commence in 2022–2023.

See also
 British Joint Special Forces Aviation Wing
 Canadian 427 Special Operations Aviation Squadron
 French 4th Special Forces Helicopter Regiment
 Italian 3rd Special Operations Helicopter Regiment
 U.S. 160th Special Operations Aviation Regiment – Night Stalkers

References

Aviation units and formations of the Australian Army
Military units and formations established in 2008